Anand Jon Alexander (born November 28, 1973), better known as Anand Jon, is an Indian-born American celebrity fashion designer and convicted rapist who appeared on America's Next Top Model and was listed in Newsweeks ”Who’s Next in 2007?”. In November 2008, Jon was convicted at the Los Angeles Court on one count of rape and multiple counts of lesser sexual offenses. He was sentenced to 59 years to life. Jon was facing similar charges in New York, but before the trial began in 2013, the New York prosecutors accepted his guilty plea, and he was sentenced to time served.

Career 
Jon was born in Kerala, India. At 16, he won a scholarship to the Art Institute of Fort Lauderdale, Florida, and moved to United States. He moved to New York and joined Parsons The New School for Design making the transition from fine art to fashion. Upon graduating from Parsons, where the Associate Dean was Tim Gunn, Jon launched his debut collection "Amazone" in 1999.

As Jon's brand gained popularity with his Kama Sutra Indo chic fusions, he was sponsored by Giorgio Armani. Jon also credits Gianni Versace for his start in the fashion world.

Jon attracted celebrities, socialites and royalty as clients, some of whom debuted as models on his runway shows and projects, including Michelle Rodriguez, Amanda Hearst and Lydia Hearst, Paris Hilton and Nicky Hilton, and others. "If you were a wannabe, he was the perfect tailcoat to ride on", according to Catherine Saxton, a fashion publicist in New York.

In 2006 Jon founded a denim design company Jeanisis Fashion Inc., and the same year he received capitalization from the Joseph Stevens & Co. Inc. investment firm.

Arrest and conviction 
Jon was arrested in March 2007 in Beverly Hills, California, on rape and related charges. He pleaded not guilty to all charges. He had no prior felony convictions. The prosecutors accused Jon of luring women and girls to his apartment under the pretext of securing modeling jobs. Jon claimed that the sexual activity was consensual, and that one minor who accused him of rape had lied about her age.

On November 13, 2008, he was convicted on one count of rape of an adult woman and multiple other charges including unlawful conduct and contributing to delinquency of minors. In July 2009 the judge denied Jon's request for a new trial. Jon dismissed his attorneys before his sentencing as he suspected that they were in collaboration with the prosecutors. He represented himself for the sentencing phase of the proceedings. On August 31, 2009, Jon was sentenced to 59 years to life.

Jon was also indicted in Texas and New York on multiple charges alleging sexual assault. All but one of the charges were dropped in the New York trial.

Los Angeles case controversy 
Jon asserts that during his trial, juror No. 12 was not an impartial juror. Although prohibited, juror No. 12 had discussed the case with his tenant and told her he felt the girls on the stand all seemed to have the same or similar stories, and that he was under the impression they had all collaborated. Due to his fellow jurors’ anger towards him, juror No. 12 felt he was pressured to give a verdict that he didn’t want to give. Also, during deliberations, several jurors complained to the judge that juror No. 12 was refusing to properly deliberate and had made up his mind about the evidence. Although the jury foreman had requested that juror No. 12 be removed for refusal to deliberate, it was denied by Judge Wesley.

Juror No. 12 also attempted to initiate contact with the defendant's sister, Sanjana. Under fear of repercussion to her brother, she responded to juror No. 12's demands and called the phone number she was handed by him during trial. In November juror No. 12 changed his vote from "not guilty" to "guilty" after the defendant's sister refused to meet him. Before a verdict was reached, juror No. 12 re-initiated contact with Sanjana, once again asking her to meet him. After she informed the court, a meeting was scheduled and it was arranged for her to record the meeting with a wire. Prior to the meeting, juror No. 12 was intercepted by District Attorney Investigators informing him of the criminal investigation he was under, thus sabotaging the meeting.

Regarding his actions, juror No. 12 was summoned to a questioning where, under oath, he testified to have never spoken with Sanjana during the trial. Defense attorneys then presented a tape with their conversation, along with phone records, proving that the juror had falsely testified. Juror No. 12 pleaded the Fifth Amendment to "not further incriminate himself" for perjury. The trial judge refused to consider or hold evidentiary hearings in these matters and the defendant’s request for a new trial was denied.

Jon also asserts that there were inconsistencies in the victims’ testimonies. During the trial, it was shown that the lead detective had destroyed evidence crucial to Jon’s case and had not taken statements from a number of alleged victims who asserted that Jon had never sexually assaulted them.

Jon dismissed his defense lawyers during the penalty phase, as he believed that they were collaborating with the prosecution. Additionally, his defense lawyer’s daughter took a job with the D.A.'s office during the trial, while she was still working with Jon’s defense crew.

During the New York case featuring almost the same witnesses and similar charges as the Los Angeles case, the New York District Attorney’s Office offered a "time served" plea on a single count, which Jon accepted. In exchange for his plea, prosecutors agreed to turn over crucial documents. Jon’s appeal in California argues that he had ineffective counsel there; the Manhattan documents indicate that the California lawyers never obtained vital police documents and correspondence showing his accusers were squaring their stories among themselves and with his civil lawyers.

The Los Angeles trial showed that a rape kit turned out to be negative, with no assault findings. Jon submitted to and passed a polygraph test regarding the rape charge for which he was convicted.

Personal life 
Jon is a nephew of Indian classical musician and playback singer K.J. Yesudas. Jon's mother Shashi Abraham and his sister Sanjana Jon have urged the governments of the US and India to intervene and grant a new trial.

Jon has been involved in charity projects such as Universe Aids awareness tour to India with his sister Sanjana, and with Michelle Rodriguez in the rescue of wild animals from abuse via "the Nature Sanctuary".

Jon was named cultural ambassador of India for his contribution to fashion. He has won "Rising Star Award" for Fashion week of the Americas, "Designer of the Year" at Vancouver Fashion Week. He was celebrity host for MTV Asia and VH1’s Awesomely Bad Fashions. He has appeared on America's Next Top Model with Tyra Banks and on E! with Paris Hilton.

References 

1976 births
Living people
Loyola College, Chennai alumni
American fashion designers
American people of Indian descent
American people convicted of child sexual abuse
American prisoners and detainees
American people convicted of rape
American fashion businesspeople
Indian emigrants to the United States
American people of Malayali descent
Prisoners and detainees of California